Big Jake (March 2001 – June 2021) was a red flaxen Belgian gelding horse noted for his extreme height.

According to the Guinness World Records, Big Jake broke the record for the world's tallest living horse when he was measured in 2010, and he held that record for the remainder of his life.

His parents were normal-sized, and he was tall as a foal, but not exceptionally so. Big Jake was purchased by a relative of his eventual owner Jerry Gilbert, who took ownership when it became apparent that the horse would become very large and require special accommodation. Gilbert kept Big Jake at Smokey Hollow Farm, near Poynette, Wisconsin, feeding him two to three buckets of grain and a whole bale of hay daily. His stall was almost twice the size of that for a regular horse and he was transported in semi-trailers due to his size. Big Jake competed in draft horse showing competitions before retiring in 2013, and made regular appearances at the Wisconsin State Fair. Visitors to the farm were offered barn tours, which included meeting Big Jake.

Big Jake's death was announced by Smokey Hollow Farm on June 27, 2021, with Gilbert's wife stating that the death had taken place approximately two weeks prior but declining to give the media an exact date. Jerry Gilbert hailed Big Jake as a "gentle giant", and stated that he intended to keep his stall empty as a memorial.

Explanatory notes

References 

2001 animal births
2021 animal deaths
Biological records
Guinness World Records
Individual draft horses
Individual male horses
Horses in the United States